David Brock Smith is an American Republican politician currently serving in the Oregon State Senate. He represents the 1st district, which covers all of Curry County and parts of Coos and Douglas counties.

Career
Smith served on the Port Orford City Council and school board, as president of the North Curry County Chamber of Commerce, and as a member of the Curry County Planning Commission.

Smith was elected to the Curry County Board of Commissioners in 2012. In 2013, an effort to recall Smith and fellow commissioner David Itzen was started, the effort was unsuccessful. As commissioner, he worked with U.S. Senator Jeff Merkley in an effort to combat the spread of sudden oak death in southwestern Oregon.

Smith filed to run for the House in 2016. He won the general election with 60% of the vote, defeating Democrat Terry Brayer and Libertarian Tamie Kaufman. He serves on the following committees: Agriculture and Natural Resources, Energy and Environment, and Early Childhood and Family Supports, and as vice chairman of the Economic Development and Trade Committee.

On December 11, 2020, Smith and 11 other state Republican officials signed a letter requesting Oregon Attorney General Ellen Rosenblum join Texas and other states contesting the results of the 2020 presidential election in Texas v. Pennsylvania. Rosenblum announced she had filed in behalf of the defense, and against Texas, the day prior.

In a statement shortly after a mob of Trump supporters stormed the Capitol, Smith defended the rioters and claimed that unconstitutional actions occurred during the 2020 Pennsylvania election, saying "This was not a coup, and Rep. [Julie] Fahey's statement that those of us that signed a letter for the Oregon attorney general to uphold fair elections are 'complicit in today's violence' is shamefully arrogant and wrong. I have been very clear as this was not an act of sedition, it was to highlight the unconstitutional actions surrounding elections that occurred in Pennsylvania."

Smith was appointed to the Oregon State Senate on January 11, 2023 to fill the vacancy left when Dallas Heard resigned.

References

External links
 Campaign website
 Legislative website

Date of birth missing (living people)
Place of birth missing (living people)
Republican Party members of the Oregon House of Representatives
Oregon city council members
County commissioners in Oregon
School board members in Oregon
People from Curry County, Oregon
21st-century American politicians
Living people
Year of birth missing (living people)
Port Orford, Oregon